The 2019 Chinese Grand Prix (formally known as the Formula 1 Heineken Chinese Grand Prix 2019) was a Formula One motor race that took place on 14 April 2019 at the Shanghai International Circuit in Shanghai, China. The race was the 3rd round of the 2019 Formula One World Championship, and marked the 16th time that the Chinese Grand Prix had been run as a round of the Formula One World Championship. This is also the last Chinese Grand Prix held to date with the 2020–2023 Grands Prix not held due to the COVID-19 pandemic in the country.

Background

Championship standings before the race
Heading into the race, Valtteri Bottas was leading the Drivers' Championship by one point from Lewis Hamilton. Bottas's team Mercedes was leading the Constructors' Championship by 39 points from Ferrari.

Entrants

The drivers and teams were the same as the season entry list with no additional stand in drivers for either the race or practice.

Free practice 
Sebastian Vettel was fastest in the first practice session with Valtteri Bottas fastest in the second practice. Bottas was again fastest in FP3 on Saturday, however the session was brought to a premature end when Alexander Albon lost control of his Toro Rosso and hit the wall on the exit of the final corner, smashing into the wall rear-first with an impact of 49g. He would not compete in qualifying due to the damage sustained from the accident and therefore started from the pitlane.

Qualifying

The first qualifying session ended with no incidents with Valtteri Bottas setting the fastest lap of the session ahead of Charles Leclerc and teammate Lewis Hamilton. Qualifying ended with the elimination of Lance Stroll, George Russell, Robert Kubica, Antonio Giovinazzi and Alex Albon, the last two of whom failed to set a time in the session.

The second qualifying session ended without incident with Lewis Hamilton setting the fastest lap on the medium compound tyre. Valtteri Bottas, Sebastian Vettel, Charles Leclerc and Max Verstappen also set their laps on the medium compound tyre. Daniil Kvyat, Sergio Pérez, Kimi Räikkönen, Carlos Sainz Jr. and Lando Norris were eliminated from qualifying.

The third qualifying session ended without incident with most drivers having two chances to set a fastest lap. After the first runs, Valtteri Bottas was quickest with Lewis Hamilton and Sebastian Vettel rounding off the top 3. When setting up their second runs, Max Verstappen was overtaken at turn 14 by Sebastian Vettel and both Renault cars, this prevented him from crossing the line before the end of the session. Pierre Gasly and both Haas cars were also unable to start a lap before the session ended as a result. At the end of the session, Valtteri Bottas was on pole position 0.023 seconds ahead of Lewis Hamilton in second. Sebastian Vettel qualified third. The rest of the top ten consisted of, in qualifying order, Charles Leclerc, Max Verstappen, Pierre Gasly, Daniel Ricciardo, Nico Hülkenberg, Kevin Magnussen and Romain Grosjean.

Qualifying classification

Notes
  – Antonio Giovinazzi failed to set a time during qualifying and was permitted to race at the stewards' discretion.
   – Alexander Albon did not take part in qualifying after crashing in FP3 and was permitted to race at the stewards' discretion. He was required to start from the pit lane after changing his survival cell. He also received a five-place grid penalty for an unscheduled gearbox change.

Race

Lewis Hamilton won the race ahead of his teammate Valtteri Bottas and Ferrari's Sebastian Vettel.

At the start of the race Bottas got a bad start allowing Hamilton to lead into the first corner. At the fourth corner Daniil Kvyat, Carlos Sainz Jr. and Lando Norris collided which would cause Norris and Kvyat to retire later in the race, despite Kvyat receiving a drive-through penalty as the stewards blamed him for the incident. On lap 11 Charles Leclerc was ordered by Ferrari to let his teammate Vettel past. Nico Hülkenberg retired on lap 17 with an MGU-K problem. Daniel Ricciardo managed to score his first points of the season and his first points for Renault. Pierre Gasly got the first fastest lap of his career.

Race classification 

Notes
  – Includes one point for the fastest lap.
  – Lando Norris was classified as he completed more than 90% of the race distance.

Championship standings after the race
 

Drivers' Championship standings

Constructors' Championship standings

 Note: Only the top five positions are included for both sets of standings.

References

Chinese
Chinese Grand Prix
Grand Prix
Chinese Grand Prix